Polly Elwes, born Mary Freya Elwes (29 February 1928 – 15 July 1987), was a BBC Television in-vision announcer from 1957 to 1960. She attended the Central School of Speech and Drama, now a part of the University of London.

Television career
Elwes was a reporter on the BBC news programme Tonight from 1959 to 1962. She was also a panellist on BBC TV's What's My Line? from 1959 to 1960 and Face the Music from 1971 to 1974. She was also a contributor to the BBC TV programme What's New? in 1962–63.

Personal life
She was the daughter of the barrister Sir Richard A Elwes (1901–1968) and Mary Freya Sykes (1904–1994) and granddaughter of the tenor Gervase Elwes. She was married to BBC TV sports broadcaster Peter Dimmock from 12 March 1960 until her death. In 1962 their home in Campden Hill Gardens, Kensington, west London, was featured in an article in Homes & Gardens magazine. They had three daughters, Amanda, Christina, and Freya. Elwes died on 15 July 1987, at her home in Newbury, Berkshire, after 11 years of bone cancer.

References

External links

BBC people
Radio and television announcers
1928 births
1987 deaths
Alumni of the Royal Central School of Speech and Drama